Follow: Find You is the seventh extended play by the South Korean boy group Monsta X. It was released by Starship Entertainment and distributed by Kakao M on October 28, 2019. It consists of eight tracks, including the title track "Follow".

Background and release
The EP had two lead singles, with "Find You" pre-released on October 22 and "Follow" released with the EP on October 28. It was also Monsta X's final release that member Wonho participated in the promotion of before his departure from the group on October 31.

The EP was released in four versions.

Critical reception
"Follow" was noted for its use of traditional Korean inspired elements, in both the song and music video, including hanbok-inspired outfits and the use of the taepyeongso. It was described by Tamar Herman of Billboard as "an explosive dance track tinged with EDM breakdowns and moombahton-inspired beats". 

Jeff Benjamin of Billboard called the EP a return "to a lighter and fun sound" for the group following their "darker" albums Take.1 Are You There? and Take.2 We Are Here. Benjamin felt it was exemplified, by the first track "Find You", which he described as a "serene, synth ballad", as well as their dynamic title track "Follow", which he compared to the group's hit track "Hero". He went on to note "Monsta Truck" as a "blend of smooth groove and industrial breakdowns", "Disaster" as "a bare-bone boom-bap production, that allows the rappers Joohoney and I.M's aggressive delivery to shine", "U R" as an "acoustic-leaning R&B cut", and "Mirror" with its "warm, brassy production". Michael Cerio of Radio.com also added that the group "finds a balance between ballads and bangers, exploring the connection they share with each other and adding another chapter of tunes to the tale", summarizing the whole EP as "bouncing between immersive ballads and pulse-quickening jams that snap expectations" and "the sound of K-pop secure in its sound".

Listicles

Commercial performance
The EP is certified platinum in South Korea, with 266,819 units sold as of 2021. It peaked at number one on the weekly Gaon Album Chart.

The pre-release single "Find You" and lead single "Follow" both charted on the Billboard World Digital Song Sales chart, at number twenty-one and five, respectively, as with the song "Mirror", peaking at number twenty. While they did not appear on the Gaon Digital Chart, all the tracks on the EP appeared on its component chart, the Gaon Download Chart, with "Find You" peaking at 142, "Follow" at 52, "Monsta Truck" at 182, "U R" at 184, "Disaster" at 195, "Burn It Up" at 189, "See You Again" at 190, and "Mirror" at 196. It had two music show wins on The Show and M Countdown.

Track listing

Charts

Album

Weekly charts

Monthly chart

Year-end chart

Songs

Weekly charts

Certification and sales

Accolades

Awards and nominations

Release history

See also
 List of K-pop songs on the Billboard charts
 List of K-pop albums on the Billboard charts
 List of K-pop songs on the World Digital Song Sales chart
 List of Gaon Album Chart number ones of 2019

References

2019 EPs
Korean-language EPs
Monsta X EPs
Starship Entertainment EPs